Thomas Donald Black (July 9, 1941September 9, 2017) was an American professional basketball player. He was a 6'10" (208 cm) 220 lb (100 kg) center and played collegiately at the University of Wisconsin–Madison and South Dakota State University. He graduated from high school in West Salem, Wisconsin.

Black was selected by the Baltimore Bullets in the 9th round (2nd pick) of the 1964 NBA draft.

In his brief NBA career in 1970–71, he played for the Seattle SuperSonics and the Cincinnati Royals.

Notes

1941 births
2017 deaths
Baltimore Bullets (1963–1973) draft picks
Basketball players from Wisconsin
Centers (basketball)
Cincinnati Royals players
Phillips 66ers players
Seattle SuperSonics players
South Dakota State Jackrabbits men's basketball players
Wisconsin Badgers men's basketball players
American men's basketball players